The Henry Moore Foundation is a registered charity in England, established for education and promotion of the fine arts — in particular, to advance understanding of the works of Henry Moore. The charity was set up with a gift from the artist in 1977. The Foundation supports a wide range of projects, including student bursaries, fellowships for artists and financial grants to various arts institutions. It operates from Perry Green in Hertfordshire and at the Henry Moore Institute in Leeds, England.

Henry Moore Institute in Leeds
The Henry Moore Institute in Leeds is a centre for the study of sculpture. It is part of The Henry Moore Foundation, which is based at Moore's former home in Hertfordshire and was  set up by the artist in 1977.   The institute has a sculpture gallery for international sculpture shows, both contemporary and historical, as well as two other display spaces for sculpture study exhibitions.   The institute also features a sculpture archive and library, and looks after the sculpture collections of its neighbour Leeds Art Gallery.  It hosts a year-long programme of events, including lectures, seminars and conferences. Admission is free.

Henry Moore Foundation at Perry Green
The foundation is the name of Moore's art charity, and also of his former estate, which welcomes thousands of visitors every year. it includes the artist's restored home Hoglands, and its flower garden, his studios, and over 70 acres of less formal gardens and fields containing many of his monumental sculptures.  The grounds also feature the Sheep Field Barn gallery with changing exhibititions, and the medieval Aisled Barn with a display of nine large colourful tapestries based on his drawings.  The estate is open seasonally to everyone, with an admission fee.

The foundation's headquarters are at Perry Green, and its large collections of his work.  The collections include sculptures in stone, wood, plaster and bronze, drawings and sketchbooks, graphic work, and preparatory materials such as found objects and maquettes. The art works are exhibited around the world, including institutions such as: the Kremlin Museums in Moscow, Russia and the Pomodoro Foundation in Milan, Italy.

As well as running the Henry Moore Institute, the foundation gives grants to museums and galleries. Its current director is Godfrey Worsdale.

Theft
Reclining Figure 1969–70, a bronze sculpture, was stolen from the foundation at the foundation's Perry Green base on 15 December 2005. Thieves are believed to have lifted the 3.6 m long, 2 m high by 2 m wide, 2.1-tonne statue onto the back of a Mercedes lorry using a crane. Police investigating the theft believe it could have been stolen for scrap value.

Notes and references

External links

Museums established in 1977
Museums in Hertfordshire
Museums in Leeds
Foundations based in the United Kingdom
Art museums and galleries in Hertfordshire
Artists' studios in the United Kingdom
Charities based in Hertfordshire
Art museums and galleries in West Yorkshire
1977 establishments in England
Arts in Leeds
Much Hadham